Francisco Alexei Carrazana Roque (born 23 December 1985) is a Cuban football midfielder.

International career
He made his international debut for Cuba in a February 2008 friendly match against Guyana and has earned a total of 3 caps, scoring no goals. He made an appearance in one match with the Cuba national football team for the 2011 CONCACAF Gold Cup which proved to be his final international game.

References

External links 

1985 births
Living people
People from Cienfuegos
Association football midfielders
Cuban footballers
Cuba international footballers
FC Cienfuegos players
2011 CONCACAF Gold Cup players